Megalotomus is a genus of broad-headed bugs in the family Alydidae. There are about eight described species in Megalotomus.

Species
These eight species belong to the genus Megalotomus:
 Megalotomus acutulus Liu & Liu, 1998
 Megalotomus castaneus Reuter, 1888
 Megalotomus costalis Stål, 1873
 Megalotomus junceus (Scopoli, 1763)
 Megalotomus obtusus Ghauri, 1972
 Megalotomus ornaticeps (Stål, 1858)
 Megalotomus quinquespinosus (Say, 1825) (lupine bug)
 Megalotomus zaitzevi Kerzhner, 1972

References

Further reading

External links

 

Articles created by Qbugbot
Alydinae
Pentatomomorpha genera